is a 1935 black and white Japanese silent film with benshi accompaniment directed by Torajiro Saito. This is a rare example of a silent Japanese slapstick film that has survived to this day.

External links
Kodakara Sodo on Internet Movie Database

1935 films
Shochiku films
Japanese silent films
Japanese black-and-white films
Japanese comedy films
1935 comedy films